Disca is a genus of moths of the family Erebidae. The genus was erected by Michael Fibiger in 2007.

Species
Disca javai Fibiger, 2007
Disca arborita Fibiger, 2007
Disca hackeri Fibiger, 2007
Disca parajavai Fibiger, 2007
Disca tegali Fibiger, 2007
Disca paulum Fibiger, 2007
Disca thailandi Fibiger, 2007
Disca anser Fibiger, 2010

References

Micronoctuini
Noctuoidea genera